Putzeysia cillisi is a species of sea snail, a marine gastropod mollusk in the family Eucyclidae.

Description
The height of the shell attains 2.5 mm.

Distribution
This species occurs in the Atlantic Ocean off Madeira.

References

cillisi
Gastropods described in 2009